Zărnești is a town in Brașov County, Transylvania, Romania, with a population of 21,681. It administers one village, Tohanu Nou (Neu-Tohan; Újtohán).

It is located near the Piatra Craiului Mountains, which are part of the Southern Carpathians mountains range. Its close proximity to the Piatra Craiului make it a common start point for tourists and hikers wishing to explore "The Piatra Craiului National Park".

History

During the Roman period, soldiers of the Legio XIII Gemina were buried in the territory that is modern day Zărnești. It is first mentioned in the year 1373 under the name Zârna and also referred to as "possessio regalis Zerne" in 1395. Other names that appeared after 1437 are Zerna, Villa Czerne, and Zernyest.

Modern day Zărnești developed in the same location as the historic one. The commune of Tohan, which is now part of the town, was first mentioned in the year 1294, and remains among the oldest settlements in Romanian which have kept their name and location unchanged.

In 1690 Battle of Zernest, Ottoman ally Imre Thököly (in cooperation with Wallachian Voivode Constantin Brâncoveanu) defeated Habsburg forces, which enabled him to become Prince of Transylvania for a short time.

Due to the topographical diversity of Zărnești and surrounding area, agriculture became the primary occupation for its residents until not too long ago. Industrialization began sometime in the 1800s, with the construction of the paper manufacturing plant in 1852, then called Celuloza, now called Celohart – EcoPaper"), and the weapons plant "6 Martie" in 1936. These projects turned Zărnești from a predominantly rural to an urban town.

In December 1939 disaster hit the town as 24 t of chlorine gas were spilled, killing 60, even at considerable distance from the plant where a storage vessel failed.

The town of Zărnești developed largely in the communist era, bringing its population to 25,000 people, which contributed to the addition of a few neighborhoods of communist era blocs. In 1951, Zărnești was declared a town, of which Tohanul Vechi (Old Tohan) became a part of. In 1968, the commune of Tohanul Nou (New Tohan) was included in Zărnești proper.
After the Romanian Revolution of 1989, the industrial plants closed, only to be sold piece by piece to private buyers.

Currently, Zărnești has enjoyed a spike in tourism, relieving some of the pressure of unemployment which followed the revolution.

Name
The Romanian name "Zărnești" is a derivation from zârnă (Black Nightshade), a word of Slavic origin (from Old Church Slavonic зрьно, grain) and suffix -ești.

Climate
Zărnești has a warm-summer humid continental climate (Dfb in the Köppen climate classification).

Notable people
 Ioan Bran de Lemény, lawyer, revolutionary, and Transylvania's first Romanian civil servant
 Gheorghe Crăciun, writer and translator
 Eduard-Michael Grosu, Romanian professional racing cyclist, born in Zărnești
 Alexandru Ilie, professional footballer 
 Rareș Manea and Silviu Manea, endurance sports athletes
 Ioan Mețianu, cleric of the Romanian Orthodox Church
 Traian Moșoiu, Romanian World War I-general, born in Tohanul Nou
 Ion Monea, Romanian boxing champion, born in Tohanul Vechi

Photo gallery

References

External links

 Official site
 English site

 
Populated places in Brașov County
Localities in Transylvania
Towns in Romania
Burzenland